The Parliament of Yugoslavia was the legislature of Yugoslavia. Before World War II in the Kingdom of Yugoslavia it was known as the National Assembly (Narodna skupština), while in the Socialist Federal Republic of Yugoslavia the name was changed to Federal Assembly. It functioned from 1920 to 1992 and resided in the building of the House of the National Assembly which subsequently served as the seat of the Parliament of Serbia and Montenegro and since 2006 hosts the National Assembly of Serbia.

Kingdom
The first parliamentary body of the state was the Temporary National Representation which existed until the first elections were held on 28 November 1920. The new parliament was known as the Constitutional Assembly. The assembly adopted the Vidovdan Constitution on 28 June 1921, after which it became known as the National Assembly.

After the end of the January 6th Dictatorship, in 1931 the kingdom returned to a constitutional monarchy and the National Assembly became the National Representation consisting of the National Assembly (lower chamber) and the
Senate (upper chamber).

Anti-Fascist Council for the National Liberation of Yugoslavia 
During the Axis occupation of Yugoslavia (1941−1944), the Anti-Fascist Council for the National Liberation of Yugoslavia (AVNOJ) was the political umbrella organization for the national liberation councils of the Yugoslav Resistance.

Socialist Federal Republic
As a result of the Treaty of Vis, AVNOJ was reformed into the Temporary National Assembly which also included several dozen members of the assembly elected in 1938. After the consolidation of power by the communists in late 1945, the Constitutional Assembly was established. The Constitutional Assembly was divided into two houses: the Federal Assembly, and the Assembly of Peoples.

With the adoption of a constitution in 1946, the name National Assembly was adopted again. It was divided into two councils (chambers): the Federal Council, and the Council of Peoples. With the amendment of the constitution in 1953, the Federal People's Assembly was divided into the Federal Council and the Council of Producers (from 1953 until 1967 the Council of Nations was a "sub-chamber" within the Federal Council).

In 1963 with the adoption of a new constitution, the Federal Assembly was divided into five chambers: the Federal Council, the Economic Council, Educational-Cultural Council, Social-Health Council and the Organization-Political Council. In 1967 the Council of Nations became it separate chamber, while in 1968 the Federal Council was demoted in favor of the Council of Nations and the Organization-Political Council changed its name into Socio-Political Council. The Federal Assembly of Yugoslavia was the only pentacameral (later hexacameral) legislature on the planet. 

After the 1974 Yugoslav Constitution was adopted, the Assembly of the SFRY was bicameral, with the lower house called the Federal Chamber and an upper house called the Chamber of Republics and Provinces. The Federal Chamber had 30 members from each Republic and 20 from each Autonomous Province, while the Chamber of Republics and Provinces had 12 members from each Republic and 8 from each Autonomous Province. The Assembly was composed of members of the League of Communists from each constituent republic appointed by electoral colleges chosen at different levels in the legal hierarchy through complex procedures.

When the League of Communists collapsed in 1990 amid ethnic tensions, the Assembly was shut down. The institution would be resurrected as the Federal Assembly of the Federal Republic of Yugoslavia in 1992, but this assembly had elected members.

Gallery

See also
List of presidents of the Federal Assembly of the Socialist Federal Republic of Yugoslavia
Parliament of Serbia and Montenegro
List of presidents of the Assembly of Serbia and Montenegro
National Assembly of Serbia - Serbia's parliament which is housed in the same building that had been the Federal Assembly building
Parliamentary Assembly of Bosnia and Herzegovina
Croatian Parliament
Parliament of Montenegro
Assembly of North Macedonia
Slovenian Parliament

References

Government of Yugoslavia
Kingdom of Yugoslavia
Socialist Federal Republic of Yugoslavia
Politics of Yugoslavia
Defunct bicameral legislatures
1920 establishments in Yugoslavia
1992 disestablishments in Yugoslavia
Yugoslavia